The Belgrade Military Parade, known as Korak pobednika ("Step/March of the Victor"), was a military parade on Nikola Tesla Boulevard on 16 October 2014, during the 70th anniversary of the liberation of Belgrade.  The city was liberated from the hands of the Nazis by the Yugoslav Partisans with the help of the Red Army during the Belgrade Offensive on 20 October 1944. It was the first military parade in the country for 30 years, and included 4,500 Serbian troops, as well as a minor number of Russian troops and the Russian aerobatic team, Swifts. President Tomislav Nikolić and Prime Minister Aleksandar Vučić attended the parade, with Russian President Vladimir Putin attending as the guest of honour. Participants in the parade were given awards for their participation, in December at Topčider.

Composition of the parade

Ground Column 
 Commander of the Parade - General Ljubiša Diković
 Members of the General Staff

 Color Guard
 Admiral of the Land Brigade
 The Training Command Module
 Aircraft Settings and Air Force and Air Defence
 Post Office Fleet
 Postal Unit of the Military Police
 Special Brigade post
 Military Academy Post-graduates
 Serbian Guards Unit
 Representative Band of the Serbian Guards Unit

Mobile Column 
 Special power set (10 Difender vehicles, 10 Puh vehicles, 10 Pincgauer motor vehicles, Vrabac unmanned vehicles)
 Brigade bindings (21 vehicles with telecommunication and IT support)
 PVO artillery-rocket units
 KUB missile system
 Setup SVLR 128mm Fire (18 SVLR Fire)
 Nora 
 HMMWV motor vehicles
 police vehicles 
 anti-skid artillery
 Engine unit setup 
 Nora B-52s
 M-11
 MIP-11
 M-80A IFV
 M-84 tanks

Air Column 
 parachute helicopter group
 MiG-29 aircraft
 MiG-21 aircraft
 Eagle Airplanes
 G-4 Group of Aircraft
 An-26 Flight Group
 Lasta aircraft
 Mi-8/17 aircraft
 Gazela aircraft
 Air Combat Aircraft"

Naval Column 
 RPC-111 patrol boat
 Kozara Special-purpose boat
 RSRB-36 Special-purpose boat
 RML-341 river miners
 RML-332 river miners
 RML-336 river miners 
 RML-335 river miners 
 DJČ-411 assault boat
 DJČ-412 assault boat
 DJČ-413 assault boat
 RPČ-22 river patrol boats 
 RPČ-213 river patrol boats 
 RPČ-212 river patrol boats 
 RPČ-216 river patrol boat

Gallery

References

Sources

External links

Military parades
Eastern Front (World War II)
Aftermath of World War II
2014 in Serbia
2014 in military history
Military history of Serbia
Events in Belgrade
Parades in Serbia
October 2014 events in Europe
2010s in Belgrade